A music festival is a community event with performances of singing and instrument playing that is often presented with a theme such as musical genre (e.g.,  rock, blues,  folk, jazz, classical music), nationality, locality of musicians, or holiday. Music festivals are generally organized by individuals or organizations within networks of music production, typically music scenes, the music industries, or institutions of music education. The music festival is the largest and one of the most important performance institutions in music life, a place for experiencing where the culture is at.

Music festivals are commonly held outdoors, with tents or roofed temporary stages for the performers. Often music festivals host other attractions such as food and merchandise vending, dance, crafts, performance art, and social or cultural activities. Many festivals are annual, or repeat at some other interval, while some are held only once. Some festivals are organized as for-profit concerts and others are benefits for a specific charitable cause.  At music festivals associated with charitable causes, there may be information about  social or political issues.

History

Ancient and medieval
The Pythian Games at Delphi included musical performances, and may be one of the earliest festivals known. During the Middle Ages, festivals were often held as competitions.

Modern

The music festival emerged in England in the 18th century as an extension of urban concert life into a form of seasonal cultural festivity structured around a schedule of music performances or concerts. Music festivals generally feature regular and extensive programming than more spontaneous or improvised forms of music festivity. In traditional genres such as folk and classical music, a music festival can be defined as a community event with performances of singing and instrument playing that is often presented with a theme such as musical genre (e.g., blues, folk, jazz, classical music), nationality, locality of musicians, or holiday.

Music festivals have developed as an emerging industry which contributes to many national economies. For example, Coachella Valley Music and Arts Festival earned $114.6 million in 2017. Music festivals nowadays also can serve as a way of building a brand for a destination, creating a unique image for it and attracting visitors.

As in Coachella Valley Music and Arts Festival there different festivals that attract many tourists. For example, Lollapalooza, Electric Daisy Carnival Las Vegas, Ultra Music Festival, Electric Forest and many more.

 There are many music festivals, some of which include many different genres, but some festivals specialize in one specific genre, such as EDM, metal, hip hop, among others.

There are also other types of festivals, such as jazz. An example of a jazz festival is the New Orleans Jazz and Heritage Festival.

While contemporary festivals are often represented as flourishing grounds for extraordinary experiences, they increasingly serve as  a way to create cultural identity, lifestyle, community, belonging and self-actualisation. Furthermore, festivals are a manifestation for creating escapism and a seasonal cultural economy to experience ritually and collectively.

Music education 

Another type of music festival is the music education, often organized annually in local communities, regionally, or nationally, for the benefit of amateur musicians of all ages and grades of achievement. Entrants perform prepared pieces or songs in front of an audience which includes competitors, family and friends, and members of the community, along with one or more adjudicators or judges. These adjudicators, who may be music teachers, professors, or professional performers, provide verbal and written feedback to each performer or group. The adjudicator may be someone whom they might never meet in any other way, as is the case when an adjudicator from
another city is brought in to judge. They also usually receive a certificate, classified according to merit or ranking, and some may win trophies or even scholarships. The most important aspect is that participants can learn from one another rather than compete. Such festivals aim to provide a friendly and supportive platform for musicians to share in the excitement of making music. For many, they provide a bridge from lessons and examinations to performing confidently in public; for a few of the top performers, they provide a pathway to further professional study of music in a college, university or conservatory.

Festivals around the world

The Sanremo Music Festival is the longest-running music festival in the world and it is also the basis and inspiration for the annual Eurovision Song Contest.
Milwaukee, Wisconsin's 11-day event, Summerfest, promotes itself as "The World's Largest Music Festival." Operating annually since 1968, the festival attracts between 800,000 and 1,000,000 people each year, and hosts over 800 musical acts. The Woodstock Festival in 1969 drew nearly 500,000 attendees, and the Polish spin-off Przystanek Woodstock in 2014 drew 750,000 thus becoming the largest open air annual festival in Europe and the second largest in the world. In comparison, the Roskilde Festival in Denmark, attracts about 135,000 spectators each year. Glastonbury Festival has a capacity of about 275,000 spectators, but has "fallow years" roughly every five years, so it is the biggest non-annual greenfield festival in the world. The oldest annual dedicated pop music festival in the world is Pinkpop Festival in the Netherlands, though in other genres, there are much older ones: the Three Choirs Festival in the UK has run annually since 1719.
The Queensland Music Festival, established in 1999 and headquartered in Brisbane Australia, is the largest music festival by land mass, as a state-wide music biennial music festival, over a three-week period during July.

Lists of music festivals

Lists of music festivals in:
 Australia
 Belgium
 Canada
 Caribbean
 Central America
 China
 Cyprus
 Denmark
 Finland
 France
 Germany
 Greece
 India
 Indonesia
 Ireland
 Israel
 Italy
 The Netherlands
 New Zealand
 Poland
 Romania
 Saudi Arabia
 Singapore
 South Korea
 United Arab Emirates
 United Kingdom
 United States

Lists of music festivals by genre 

List of jazz festivals
List of metal festivals
List of electronic music festivals
List of reggae festivals
List of punk rock festivals
List of gothic festivals

Related lists 

 List of music festivals

See also
 Rock festival
 Rave
 New rave
 Environmental impact of live music

References